A steam generator is a type of boiler used to produce steam for climate control and potable water heating in railroad passenger cars. The output of a railroad steam generator is low pressure, saturated steam that is passed through a system of pipes and conduits throughout the length of the train.

Steam generators were developed when diesel locomotives started to replace steam locomotives on passenger trains. In most cases, each passenger locomotive was fitted with a steam generator and a feedwater supply tank. The steam generator used some of the locomotive's diesel fuel supply for combustion. When a steam generator-equipped locomotive was not available for a run, a so-called "heating car" fitted with one or two steam generators was inserted between the last locomotive in the consist and the rest of the train.

Steam generators would also be fitted to individual cars to enable them to be heated independently of any locomotive supply.

In Ireland, Córas Iompair Éireann used "heating cars" as standard and CIÉ diesel locomotives were not fitted with steam generators.

Background

Solid fuel
During the early days of passenger railroading, cars were heated by a wood or coal fired stove—if any heat was provided at all. It was difficult to evenly heat the long, drafty cars. Passengers near the stove often found it uncomfortably hot, while those further away faced a cold ride. The stoves were also a safety hazard. Often cars were ignited by embers from the stove, especially in a wreck, when a dislodged stove would overturn, dumping burning coals into the car.

High pressure steam
The use of steam from the locomotive to heat cars was first employed in the late 19th century. High pressure steam from the locomotive was passed through the train via pipes and hoses. The dangers of this arrangement became evident in the accidents that plagued the industry.

Low pressure steam

In 1903, Chicago businessman Egbert Gold introduced the "Vapor" car heating system, which used low pressure, saturated steam. The Vapor system was safe and efficient, and became nearly universal in railroad applications.

Introduction of the steam generator
When steam locomotives began to be retired from passenger runs, Gold's company, now known as the Vapor Car Heating Company, developed a compact water-tube boiler that could be fitted into the rear of a diesel locomotive's engine room. Known as the Vapor-Clarkson steam generator, it and its competitors (notably the unit built by Elesco) remained a standard railroad appliance until steam heat was phased out.

The motive power was EF-1s and EP-1s by American Locomotive Company (Alco) with electrical equipment by General Electric. These articulated 2-section engines in passenger version were equipped with 2 oil-fired steam boilers, one in each section.

In Great Britain, steam generators were built for British Railways diesel locomotives  by three firms - Spanner, Clayton  and Stone. All types were notoriously unreliable and failures were very common.

In Poland, vapor steam generators were fitted to diesel passenger locomotives SP45. The boilers were removed in the 80s and 90s and replaced with 3 kV DC generators driven by main engine, when maintenance became too expensive and remaining cars not fitted with electric heating were withdrawn from service.

The New Zealand, electric locomotives class ED, used in and around Wellington, were fitted with oil-fired steam boilers manufactured by the Sentinel Waggon Works. The boilers appeared to have been used very rarely and were removed during the locomotives’ operational lives.

Steam generator types

Oil-fired
These burned diesel fuel, which is a lightweight fuel oil. The term steam generator (as opposed to boiler) usually refers to an automated unit with a long spiral tube that water is pumped through and is surrounded by flame and hot gases, with steam issuing at the output end. There is no pressure vessel in the ordinary sense of a boiler. Because there is no capacity for storage, the steam generator's output must change to meet demand. Automatic regulators varied the water feed, fuel feed, and combustion air volume.

By pumping slightly more water in than can be evaporated, the output was a mixture of steam and a bit of water with concentrated dissolved solids. A steam separator removed the water before the steam was fed to the train. An automatic blowdown valve would be periodically cycled to eject solids and sludge from the separator. This reduced limescale buildup caused by boiling hard water. Scale build-up that occurred had to be removed with acid washouts.

The New Zealand ED class (1,500 volts) electric locomotive used around Wellington from 1940 originally had oil-fired water tube boilers for passenger carriage steam heaters, which were later removed. Initially diesel-hauled passenger trains like the Northerner on the North Island Main Trunk had a separate steam heating van, but later the carriages of long-distance trains like the Overlander used electric heaters supplied by a separate power or combined power-luggage van.

Electrically-heated
In British electric locomotives the steam generator was usually an electric steam boiler, heated by a large electric immersion heater running at the (then) line voltages of 600 volts from a third rail or 1,500 volts from an overhead wire.

The Polish electric locomotive EL204 of 1937 was fitted with an electric steam generator supplied from overhead lines. The locomotive was destroyed during the second world war.

Modern times

Steam heated or cooled rail cars have been largely replaced or converted to fully electric systems. Wisps of steam issuing from normal service cars are now history in the UK, USA, Canada, and much of the rest of the world.

In the UK, much preserved stock, including main-line certified railtour sets, still retains steam heating capability as well as electric heating, and this is still sometimes used when the trains are being operated by steam locomotives or preserved diesels which have had their steam generators restored to service. Notably the Scottish Railway Preservation Society's main-line registered set of Mk1 railtour coaches are dual heat, and one of their Class 37s has had its boiler, removed in the 80s, replaced and returned to service to provide steam heat on main line tours.

Virtually all private, tourist and heritage preserved railways use BR MkI and MkII coaches, most of which are heated by steam. Some later build MkII, and some MkI's have been modified have dual-heat capability (steam and electric). An increasing number of heritage lines have electric heat capable locomotives.

The Grand Canyon Railway of Williams, Arizona still uses steam generators to keep coaches powered when their older diesels and steam locomotives are pulling the train.

See also
 Electric-steam locomotives
 Steam generator (boiler)
 Steam jet cooling

References

External links 

A web site devoted to locomotive steam generators

Passenger rail rolling stock
Boilers
Steam generators